Jeppe Bruun Wahlstrøm (born 1983 in Denmark) better known by his stage name Yepha, is a Danish, singer, rapper and hip hop artist. He was part of the rap duo UFO Yepha. After they split up, UFO and Yepha both went solo.

2002–2011: As UFO Yepha

Kristian Humaidan (known as UFO) won the freestyle championship MC's Fight Night in 2002. Soon he started collaborating as a duo with Jeppe Bruun Wahlstrøm (known as Yepha, born 1983) through Svendborg, and later from Aarhus. They were also known as Whyyou (taking lead from first letters of their names). They had a good number of chart successes before they split-up as a duo in 2011.

They had three albums charting on the official Danish Albums Chart as follows: U vs. Y (2003 – reached #28), Ingen som os (2006 – reached #20) and Kig mig i øjnene (2008 – reached #32). They released many singles as UFO Yepha including charting singles "Hver dag" (2003, reached #1), "Næh næh" (Ufo Yepha feat. Anna David) (2008 – reached #20) and "Stille og roligt knald pa" (2009, reached #27)

2011– : Solo career
While in UFO & Yepha, Yepha had collaborated with Morten Hampenberg & Alexander Brown, a collaboration that continued as a solo artist with the release of "Det stikker helt af" and "Klovn".

In 2012, Yepha released his single "Det går ned" that featured Niklas.

Discography
(For discography as a duo, see UFO Yepha discography)

Singles

Featured in

References

Danish male singers
Danish hip hop musicians
Danish rappers
1983 births
Living people